Samuel or Sam Saunders may refer to:

Sam Saunders (footballer) (born 1983), English football midfielder
Sam Saunders (golfer) (born 1987), American golfer
Sam Saunders (politician) (1905–2005), American politician in the state of Florida
Samuel Saunders, son of Laurence Saunders, English Protestant martyr
Lieutenant Colonel Samuel Saunders of Opequon Confederate order of battle

See also
Samuel Saunder, mathematician and selenologist
Samuel Sanders (1937–1999), pianist